Oud-Oost is an officially designated area of the borough of Amsterdam-Oost (Amsterdam East) in Amsterdam, Netherlands. It consists of the areas closer to the city center, traditionally known as Amsterdam East, before the borough was expanded.

It is made up of the smaller neighborhoods:
Dapperbuurt
Oosterparkbuurt
Oostpoort
Transvaalbuurt
Weesperzijde

References

Neighbourhoods of Amsterdam
Amsterdam-Oost